Austrobatrachus is a genus of toadfishes found in the Atlantic and Indian Oceans off the coast of South Africa.

Species
The recognized species in this genus are:
 Austrobatrachus foedus (J. L. B. Smith, 1947) (puzzled toadfish)
 Austrobatrachus iselesele D. W. Greenfield, 2012

References

Batrachoididae
Taxa named by J. L. B. Smith
Fish of South Africa